Niyaz Ahmed is a molecular epidemiologist, professor of microbial sciences, genomicist, and a veterinarian by training, based in Hyderabad.

Biography
Ahmed was born in Paras of Maharashtra state in 1971 and completed his early schooling from Akola. He went on to graduate in Veterinary Medicine in 1995 (Nagpur) and obtained further degrees in Animal Biotechnology (NDRI, Karnal) and Biotechnology/Infectious Diseases (PhD) (Manipal University). In December 2008, he joined the University of Hyderabad as a member of the Faculty and went on to serve as Chairman of the Department of Biotechnology and Bioinformatics. He served as Senior Director at the International Centre for Diarrhoeal Disease Research in Dhaka. Ahmed was affiliated with the University of Malaya, Kuala Lumpur, Malaysia as a Visiting Professor of Molecular Biosciences at the Institute of Biological Sciences and was an Adjunct Professor of the Academy of Scientific and Innovative Research, India. Dr Ahmed is currently working as Professor at the School of Life Sciences at the University of Hyderabad. He served as Senior Director from November 2016 to March 2020 at the International Centre for Diarrhoeal Disease Research (icddr,b), also as a member of the Senior Leadership Team (SLT) of the Centre.

Legacy
Having fathered molecular epidemiology in India, Ahmed's work provided wheels to the emerging discipline of Functional molecular infection epidemiology. His research interests encompass genomics, evolution and molecular pathogenesis of enteric pathogens with major emphasis on virulence and antimicrobial resistance. He also contributed important initial studies on the two co-evolved human pathogens, namely, Mycobacterium tuberculosis and Helicobacter pylori, in the context of evolution of adaptation mechanisms, and acquisition and optimization of virulence during colonization/infection. Ahmed also has interest in comparative genomics of bacterial pathogens obtained from single patients at different occasions and this approach nurtures the concept of 'chronological evolution and replicative genomics' as tools to study host-microbe interaction over time. Ahmed's group has developed a widely used multilocus sequence typing scheme for species level identification of pathogenic Leptospira with a potential to replace the highly ambiguous serotyping method that currently is used for Leptospiral strain identification. Ahmed has also worked extensively on the nomenclature, taxonomic status, genome sequencing and functional characterization of Mycobacterium indicus pranii, a non-pathogenic mycobacterial species with very high translational promise as an immunotherapeutic. Ahmed taught courses in Molecular and Cell Biology, Intellectual Property Rights and Biosafety, Research and Publication Ethics and Research Methodology.

Recognitions, awards and honors

Niyaz Ahmed served as Section Editor (Genomics and Microbiology) of PLoS ONE (from August 2008 to September 2013) wherein he provided editorial oversight to the "PLoS ONE Prokaryotic Genome Collection". Ahmed also served as a member of the PLoS International Advisory Group and was the founding Editor-in-Chief of Gut Pathogens journal, published by BioMed Central Ltd. (London). 
Ahmed was elected as fellow of the National Academy of Sciences of India and was admitted as fellow of the Royal Society of Chemistry in January 2015  and a fellow of the American Academy of Microbiology in 2018.

Ahmed is serving as a member of the editorial boards of the following scientific journals:

Gut Pathogens - Editor in Chief
Infection Genetics and Evolution - Receiving Editor
Helicobacter - Editorial Board Member

Ahmed has been awarded with the following notable awards:

Shanti Swarup Bhatnagar Prize, India's highest science award  - 2016
National Bioscience Award for Career Development  - 2011
University of Hyderabad Chancellor's Award  - 2015

References

External links
 

21st-century Indian Muslims
Science bloggers
Living people
Manipal Academy of Higher Education alumni
1971 births
Indian biotechnologists
Indian microbiologists
Recipients of the Shanti Swarup Bhatnagar Prize for Science and Technology
Recipients of the Shanti Swarup Bhatnagar Award in Medical Science
N-BIOS Prize recipients
Fellows of the American Academy of Microbiology